Featherbed Nature Reserve is a privately owned nature reserve on the Western Headland of the Knysna River Estuary on  South Africa’s Garden Route. 

It was founded by South African television teacher,  William Smith, on land that was bought in the 1950s by his father, the chemist and ichthyologist Professor JLB Smith, with the proceeds of his best selling book, ‘Old Fourlegs The Story of the Coelacanth,’ published in 1956.

The reserve opened to visitors in 1984, and is only accessible to the public by ferry. Smith sold the reserve to Eastern-Cape-based businessman Kobus Smit in 2008.

Fauna & Flora 
Featherbed Nature Reserve is situated within the Cape Floristic Region. Its vegetation is characterised by Knysna Sand Fynbos and coastal dune thicket. Large portions of the fynbos, and large stands of invasive alien vegetation (particularly rooikrans - Acacia cyclops), which once infested the Reserve, were decimated by fires in the 2017 Cape storm and Kynsna fires. Following the fires, the reserve management instituted a systematic eradication programme in an attempt to contain the resurgence of the rooikrans. 

Fauna observed on the reserve includes Cape bushbuck, blue duiker, African clawless otter, and many smaller mammals. Birdlife includes the Knysna turaco (Knysna loerie) and African Black Oystercatcher.

References

External links
 Featherbed Co. official website

Knysna
Nature reserves in South Africa
Nature conservation in South Africa
Tourist attractions in South Africa
Tourist attractions in the Western Cape
Tourism in the Western Cape